Vitaliy Shchedov (born 31 July 1987) is a Ukrainian professional racing cyclist.

Career highlights

References

External links

1987 births
Living people
Ukrainian male cyclists
Ukrainian track cyclists
Olympic cyclists of Ukraine
Cyclists at the 2008 Summer Olympics
Place of birth missing (living people)